Josie Records was a subsidiary of  Jubilee Records in New York City that was active from 1954 to 1971.

The label's best selling bands were The Cadillacs ("Speedoo"), Bobby Freeman and the Meters.

Other hits for Josie Records included the Chips' "Rubber Biscuit" (immortalized many years later by the Blues Brothers), and J. Frank Wilson and the Cavaliers' version of Wayne Cochran's "Last Kiss".

Discography

Josie Jazz Series
JOZ-3500 - Gigi Gryce and Donald Byrd - Gigi Gryce & Donald Byrd - 1962
JOZ-3501 - Cu-Bop - Art Blakey and Sabu Martinez - 1962 - Reissue of Jubilee JGM- 1049 
JOZ-3502 - Alto Saxophone - Herb Geller - 1962
JOZ-3503 - Jackie McLean Quintet - Jackie McLean -1963 - with Donald Byrd, Doug Watkins, Ronald Tucker, Mal Waldron
JOZ-3504 - Ray Draper Tuba Jazz - Ray Draper - 1963
JOZ-3505 - Teddy Charles Trio Plays Duke Ellington - Teddy Charles - 1963
JOZ-3506 - Med Flory Big Band - Med Flory - 1963
JOZ-3507 - Jackie McLean Sextet - Jackie McLean - 1963
JOZ-3508 - Mingus Three - Charles Mingus - 1963
JOZ-3509 - Eddie Costa with the Burke Trio - Eddie Costa - 1963

References

Record labels established in 1954
Record labels disestablished in 1971
American independent record labels
Jazz record labels
Rock and roll record labels
Soul music record labels